Tareen Jahan (born 26 July) is a Bangladeshi actress, model and singer. In 1987 or 1988, she stood first at the reality television competition program Notun Kuri for acting, dancing and storytelling divisions. Since then she started working on television as a child artist. She won Meril Prothom Alo Awards in 2006, 2007 and 2012.

Early life
Jahan came first in the acting, dancing, and storytelling category in Bangladeshi talent hunt Notun Kuri in 1985. She took classical music lessons from Hasan Ikram Ullah. Seeing Jahan's interest and enthusiasm for dancing, her mother, Tahmina Begum, would send her daughter to Tapan Das Gupta to learn dancing at the age of three and a half years. She was the youngest among the five sisters. She obtained a master's degree in social work from Lalmatia Women's College.

Career

Acting
Jahan got her first major role as a child actor in the TV serial Ei Shob Din Ratri then she acted on the mega serial named Songsoptok, based on the novel by Shahidullah Kaiser, as a child artist in 1988. She started her career as a lead actress in a Bangla drama named Kathalburi against Tauquir Ahmed, aired on ATN Bangla. Jahan has appeared in numerous television plays including Eishob Dinratri, Shongshoptok, Ful Baganer Sap, Kotha Chilo Onyorokom, U Turn, Maya, Harano Akash, Rajkonya, Shobuj Velvet and Ogni Bolaka. She also acted in many telefilms. She acted in two films – Pirit Ratan Pirit Jatan and Kajaler Dinratri. As a child actress, she appeared first in the TV serial Eishob Dinratri in a lead role. In 1988, a TV serial based on the novel of Shahidullah Kaiser named Shongshoptok featured Jahan in a child role.

Jahan gave voice in two of the Indian-Bangla films for Priyanka Tribedi and Priyanka Bannerji. She also voiced Shabnur in one Bangla film. Jahan and her two sisters, Shameema Nahrin Jahan Tuhin and Nahin Kazi, owned a production house named Tana, made up of Ta from Tareen Jahan and Na from Nahin Kazi. Jahan is no longer involved with this production and owns a new production house named A New Tree Entertainment.

Singing
Jahan released her first solo album, named Akash Debo Kake, in Eid ul Adha in 2011. There were ten tracks on the album, with four duet tracks where she sang with Raghab Chatterjee and Rupankar Bagchi of Kolkata and Ibrar Tipu and Tapan Chowdhury of Bangladesh. Joy Sarkar and Rupankar of Kolkata and Bappa Mazumder, Ibrar Tipu and Belal Khan were the composers of the album. All the tracks are based on different themes including mind, suffering, rain, hope, pain, sky, request, mother and others. She dedicated a song titled "Amar Prothom Dekha Nayok" to her father. This song was penned by Julfikar Rasel and composed by Ibrar Tipu. She also sang the title song of a drama named "Shopno Gulo Jonak Pokar Moto". This song was written by Arun Chowdhury and composed by Ibrar Tipu. Jahan, along with her elder sister Tuhin, own a production company.

Personal life
Jahan was married to Sohel Arman, a son of filmmaker Amjad Hossain, for less than a year in 2001.

Television appearances

Dramas and telefilms

Television

Filmography
Tarin acted in two films, Pirit Roton Pirit Joton and Kajoler Dinratri. Kajoler Dinratri was submitted for National Film Awards 2013.

Discography

Solo

Film Scores

Awards and nominations

References

External links
 

Living people
Bangladeshi film actresses
Bangladeshi television actresses
Year of birth missing (living people)
Place of birth missing (living people)
Best TV Actress Meril-Prothom Alo Critics Choice Award winners
Best TV Actress Meril-Prothom Alo Award winners